Biretta Peak is a small peak,  high, on the east side of Pain Mesa in the Mesa Range, Victoria Land. It was named by the northern party of the New Zealand Geological Survey Antarctic Expedition, 1962–63, from its resemblance to the square cap worn by Roman Catholic and some Anglican clerics.

References

 

Mountains of Victoria Land
Borchgrevink Coast